The Serbian True Orthodox Church (STOC) is a denomination that separated from the Serbian Orthodox Church in 1996. Its founder and current leader is bishop Akakije (Stankovic). The members refer to themselves as revnitelji ('consistent', 'persistent'); they are informally called ziloti ('zealots') by the public. The church is part of the traditionalist True Orthodoxy movement, a loose group of Orthodox churches which resist ecumenism and other attempts of modernization within the mainstream churches.

History
The Serbian True Orthodox Church originated in the 1990s, when three Serb monks returned from the Esphigmenou Monastery on Mount Athos, a stronghold of Greek Old Calendarists. Among them was Nemanja Stanković, who later took the church name Akakije. In 1996 Akakije returned to Serbia and established a monk community on Fruška Gora mountain, near Nova Ravanica monastery. The movement follows the "old calendarist" doctrines of rejecting all perceived attempts at reform of the church, particularly ecumenism and other contacts with "heretics", baptism by aspersion and acceptance of Gregorian calendar.

As of 2014, the number of followers of the church is estimated to several hundred. In a 2010 interview, hegumenia of Novi Stjenik monastery stated that "there is 350 of us, but the number of sympathizers is much larger".

The relationships of the STOC and the mainstream Serbian Orthodox Church (SOC) have been tense. The SOC considers the members of the church to be "schismatics, fundamentalists and heretics". In an article in Svetosavlje, official magazine of the SOC, bishop Atanasije Jevtić analyzed history and theology of the STOC, refuting their "theological blunders", as he puts it.

Churches and monasteries
In 2007, sisterhood of Stjenik monastery near Čačak refused loyalty to the Serbian Orthodox Church after it signed the Ecumenic Charter agreeing to hold a Great Christian Communion in Niš in 2013. After they were expelled from the monastery, they founded a new one, called "Novi Stjenik", in remote Kučaj mountains in eastern Serbia. In 2010, the monastery had 13 nuns.

A former weekend house on Fruška Gora was turned into a men's Monastery, called "Church of Saint Cyril and Metodius". , the monastery had three monks.

Since 2012, the STOC has been building a church of Utešiteljevo near Ralja, south of Belgrade. The church is its formal episcopal seat.

All STOC monasteries and churches hoist a black flag with inscription "Orthodoxy or death!".

Child camp controversy
In August 2014, the Serbian True Orthodox Church organized the second "Holy Lazar Orthodox Youth Camp" on Kučaj mountains, that gathered a number of 12- to 18-year-olds. They came in the focus of Serbian public after it was revealed that the children were taught how to operate air-soft replicas of Kalashnikov rifles, among other military skills. The organizers were criticized of child recruitment and child abuse. Bishop Akakije and Efrosinija, hegumenia of the Novi Stjenik monastery, stated that the camp was organized by a model of similar camps in Russia, as well as scouting camps worldwide, that the children were taught outdoor survival skills and self-defense, and the shooting training was only one day of a 10-day course. The police and the public prosecutor of the city of Bor started an investigation of the case.

References

External links
 Is the Serbian True Orthodox Church schismatic? by Vladimir Moss
 Bulletin of the Synod Council
 Holy Lazar Orthodox Youth Camp activities

Eastern Orthodox organizations established in the 20th century
True Orthodox denominations